The 2020 term of the Supreme Court of the United States began October 5, 2020, and concluded October 3, 2021. The table below illustrates which opinion was filed by each justice in each case and which justices joined each opinion.

Table key

2020 term opinions

2020 term membership and statistics
This was the sixteenth term of Chief Justice Roberts's tenure and the first term for Justice Barrett. The Court began its term with a vacant seat following the death of Justice Ruth Bader Ginsburg on September 18, 2020. The seat was filled by Amy Coney Barrett on October 26, 2020.

Notes

References

 
 

Lists of United States Supreme Court opinions by term